Robert Adams Jr. (February 26, 1849 – June 1, 1906) was an American diplomat and politician from Pennsylvania who served as a Republican member of the U.S. House of Representatives for Pennsylvania's 2nd congressional district from 1893 to 1906.  He served as the United States Minister to Brazil from 1889 to 1890 and as a member of the Pennsylvania State Senate for the 6th district from 1883 to 1885.

Early life and education
Adams was born in Philadelphia, Pennsylvania to Robert and Matilda Maybin Hart Adams.

In 1869, he graduated from the University of Pennsylvania and was a member of St. Anthony Hall. He then attended Doctor Fairies Physical Institute in Philadelphia. He studied law under George W. Biddle and was admitted to the bar in 1872 but never practiced law.

Career
He was a member of the United States Geological Survey during the explorations of Yellowstone National Park, from 1871 to 1875. Adams served as a member of the National Guards of Pennsylvania, from 1881 to 1895, serving as judge-advocate and major, also on start duty, and as a member of the Pennsylvania State Senate, from 1883 to 1887. He was an aide-de-camp on the staff of Governor Beaver of Pennsylvania with the rank of lieutenant-colonel in 1885.

On April 10, 1880, Adams participated in a duel against Dr. James William White. Both Adams and White were members of First Troop Philadelphia City Cavalry; White wanted permission to wear the distinctive uniform of the Troop while he saw patients. Adams criticized White, and soon the two agreed to duel. They traveled to Maryland for the affair of honor. Both men fired at 15 paces, but neither man struck his mark and the affair ended without injury. At a meeting years later, Adams asked White, "You fired in the air, didn't you?" White said he did. Adams responded, "I didn't. I fired at you."

He was appointed United States Minister to Brazil on April 1, 1889, and served until June 1, 1890, when he resigned. He was elected to Congress as a Republican to fill the vacancy caused by the death of Charles O'Neill on December 19, 1893.

He then served as a Republican representative from the 2nd Pennsylvania district in the congresses 53rd, 54th and 55th, when acting chairman of the committee on foreign affairs and reported the Cuban resolutions and the declaration of war against Spain.

Last years
He was re-elected to the 56th, 57th and 58th congresses also from the 2d Pennsylvania district, serving until his death, and was a member of various committees, while he contributed to periodicals and lectured.

Adams committed suicide in Washington, D.C. on June 1, 1906, by shooting himself after heavy losses in stock speculation. He is interred at the Laurel Hill Cemetery in Philadelphia, Pennsylvania.

Society membership
He was elected a member of the follow Societies:
 Historical Society of Pennsylvania
 Society of the Cincinnati
 Pennsylvania Society of the Sons of the Revolution
 Society of the War of 1812
 Society of Colonial Wars

See also
List of United States Congress members who died in office (1900–1949)

References

Sources
 
 
 

1849 births
1906 suicides
19th-century American lawyers
19th-century American politicians
Ambassadors of the United States to Brazil
American lawyers admitted to the practice of law by reading law
American politicians who committed suicide
Burials at Laurel Hill Cemetery (Philadelphia)
American duellists
Explorers of the United States
Pennsylvania lawyers
Republican Party Pennsylvania state senators
Politicians from Philadelphia
Republican Party members of the United States House of Representatives from Pennsylvania
Suicides by firearm in Washington, D.C.
Wharton School of the University of Pennsylvania alumni
Yellowstone National Park
1906 deaths